Sebastiano Pisani may refer to:

 Sebastiano Pisani (iuniore) (1630–1690), Italian Roman Catholic bishop
 Sebastiano Pisani (seniore) (1606–1670), Italian Roman Catholic bishop